This article lists the confirmed squads lists for badminton's 2014 Thomas & Uber Cup.

Thomas Cup

Group A

Indonesia

Thailand

Singapore

Nigeria

Group B

Japan

Denmark

Hong Kong

England

Group C

Malaysia

South Korea

India

Germany

Group D

China

Chinese Taipei

Russia

France

Uber Cup

Group W

China

Chinese Taipei

England

Russia

Group X

South Korea

Indonesia

Singapore

Australia

Group Y

Thailand

India

Hong Kong

Canada

Group Z

Japan

Denmark

Germany

Malaysia

References

Squads